Beverly Hannah-Jones (born 1960) is an architect, entrepreneur, and community leader in the U.S. state of Michigan. She has been profiled as an "architect extraordinaire" as early as May 1995, and as half of "the dynamic duo of Detroit's downtown restaurants."

While in a pre-medical program at MSU, she took a few drafting courses, and then switched her major to architecture and began pursuing the goal of owning her own firm. She transferred to Lawrence Technological University in order to simultaneously build architectural skills and learn to run a business. She earned a bachelor's degree in 1985 and took a job with Albert Kahn Associates, where she worked for eight years and earned her architectural license. She then moved on to a smaller firm in Pontiac to get hands-on experience with business leadership, and the next year, launched her own firm, Hannah & Associates, Inc.  She established a strong design and technical foundation while employed with the historic A/E firm, Albert Kahn Associates (AKA), and remains on the cutting edge of technology in architecture. She is also the proud recipient of the Lawrence Technological University 2009 Distinguished Alumni Achievement Award, as the first African American to receive this award in the history of LTU.

In 1993 she founded Hannah & Associates, Inc. (HAI) to provide professional architectural and interior design services. It is
one of only ten architectural firms owned and operated by a licensed African American Female Architect in the United States.
Ms. Hannah Jones has 30 years of experience in the architectural planning, design and construction industry. Her
professional experiences range from project architect, project designer, project manager through project principal and owner
of the corporation. She has built a successful practice based upon design excellence and sound business practices. Her
unique skill sets are a direct result of the breadth of experiences throughout her career.

As of 1996 her firm, Hannah & Associates Inc., was one of only ten architecture firms in the United States owned by Black women. Early projects included a church sanctuary and automotive contracts, including collaboration with Albert Kahn. In 2005 Hannah & Associates was one of only five firms founded and run by Black women.

Hannah & Associates formed a partnership with Niagara Murano LLC, a firm owned by a former colleague from Albert Kahn, in 2004. The firms designed several restaurants for Detroit's Southern Hospitality Restaurant Group. In 2005 Hannah Jones was appointed to the Michigan Fire Safety Board.

In 2013 Hannah & Associates formed a strategic partnership with Newman-Smith Architecture. In addition to her roles at HAI, Beverly is a Managing Partner of Hannah-Neumann/Smith. As Managing Partner, she has 
responsibility for all contractual matters and oversees the quality and progress of the project from start to finish.
Her recent venture in the construction industry is to launch a fleet of construction dump trucks with her new company,
Arawana Construction Trucking, Inc.

See also 
 Architecture of metropolitan Detroit

Buildings
 Wright-Kay Building Renovation

Projects
 Seldom Blues
Detroit's Breakfast House @ Merchants Row and Grand City Grille
Historic Cornice & Slate Building
Skillman Foundation, Talon Center Building Renovations

Awards
 Lawrence Technological University 2009 Distinguished Alumni Achievement Award

References 

American women architects
Lawrence Technological University alumni
Michigan State University
1960 births
African-American architects
21st-century American architects
Living people
People from Detroit
21st-century American women